Paul Opperman (born 20 December 1979) is an Irish sprinter. He competed in the men's 4 × 400 metres relay at the 2000 Summer Olympics.

References

External links
 

1979 births
Living people
Athletes (track and field) at the 2000 Summer Olympics
Irish male sprinters
Olympic athletes of Ireland
Place of birth missing (living people)